Alla Grigorievna Kigel (Алла Кигель; born 1932) is a Russian theatre director. She was one of a few female directors in the Soviet Union during the 1960s. Her work followed Stanislavski's system. Her father, Gregory Lvovich Kigel (Григорий Львович Кигель), was a theater designer.

Education
In 1945, Kigel made her directorial debut at her school with Balzac's Splendeurs et misères des courtisanes and an adaptation of Pushkin's The Gypsies.

In 1950, she was refused admission into the Russian Academy of Theatre Arts. Kigel instead pursued a career as a criminal lawyer, and gained a master's degree in law, from Moscow State University in 1954. In 1956 she enrolled in Shchukin Theatre School.

In 1993, Kigel took a course in Public Relations at Columbia University.

Work
 1991-1992 - State Television of the USSR
 1992–Present - WMNB Radio/TV Station in Fort Lee, NJ; created and directed radio/TV programs, and hosted an open line show.
 1999-2000 - Chekhov Now Off-Broadway Arts Festival; conducted a workshop for young drama directors. Prepared a stage adaptation of Chekhov’s short story "Enemies"
 2001-2003 - RTN Gold Radio Station in Fort Lee, NJ; Hosted an open line show, Dialogue
 2012 - Six Master classes in Moscow theater schools: GITIS, VGIK, Moscow Art Theatre School.

References

Russian theatre directors
1932 births
Living people